Bhanu Bhakta Dhakal is a Nepalese Politician and serving as the Member of House Of Representatives (Nepal) elected from Morang constituency-3, Province No. 1. He is the member and lawmaker of the Presidium of Nepal Communist Party. He is former Minister for Health and Population  and currently Ministrer of Culture, Tourism and Civil Aviation of Nepal Government. He is accused of allegedly embezzling state fund in the procurement of medical equipment amid the government’s battle against the outbreak of COVID-19

References

Living people
Nepal Communist Party (NCP) politicians
1962 births
Nepal MPs 2017–2022
People from Tehrathum District
Members of the 2nd Nepalese Constituent Assembly
Communist Party of Nepal (Unified Marxist–Leninist) politicians